Sanaa, or San'a, is the capital of Yemen.

Sanaa may also refer to:
Sanaa Governorate, a governorate of Yemen
Sanaa International Airport
Sanaa manuscript
San'a (patrol vessel), a Yemeni patrol vessel
Sanaa University, a Yemeni university
Sanaa, a genus of insects in the subfamily Pseudophyllinae

People with the given name
Sanaa  (   ), a  mostly feminine Arabic language name
Sanaa (   ), an Egyptian transcription for a mostly masculine Arabic language name
Sanaa Altama (born 1990), male French football player
Sanaa Atabrour (born 1989), female Moroccan taekwondo practitioner
Sanaa Benhama, female Moroccan athlete
Sanaa Bhambri (born 1988), Indian tennis player
Sanaa Ismail Hamed (born 1984), Egyptian beauty pageant contestant
Sanaa Hamri (born 1975), Moroccan music and film director
Sanaa Gamil (1930–2002), Egyptian actress
Sanaa Lathan (born 1971), American actress

Acronyms
SANAA, a Japanese architecture firm
SANAA, the national utility for water supply and sanitation in Honduras

See also
Sana (disambiguation)